Lustran and Novodur are trade names for various types of styrenic resins (ABS, ASA, SMA) owned by INEOS Styrolution, which is part of INEOS. These resins are used mainly for housings and covers requiring good toughness, strength, stiffness, chemical resistance and a good to very good surface finish. In addition to the general-purpose injection molding grades, the range comprises a large number of high heat resistant grades as well as special-purpose products for extrusion and chemical electroplating. Glass fiber reinforced and flame retardant grades are also available.

Thermoplastics
In Czech Republic (former Czechoslovakia) "Novodur" was a trade name (registered by the company Fatra a.s. for domestic use 2.6.1971) of PVC-U (non-softened polyvinylchlorid) and this term is still used in the country, mostly as colloquial term in case of material for plumber pipes.